Never Run, Never Hide was an album released in 1980 by pop-rock singer-songwriter Benny Mardones.  It included his only major hit, "Into the Night", which peaked at number 11 in 1980, and re-charted nine years later, in 1989.

In 1989, a Where Are They Now? Arizona radio segment spurred Los Angeles DJ Scott Shannon to add the song to his playlist, ultimately rocketing the song back onto the national charts, on May 6, 1989. Mardones' recording peaked this time at No. 20 the first week in July, adding 17 weeks to its previous run of 20, to add up to a total of 37 (non-consecutive) weeks, breaking the record set by Laura Branigan with her single "Gloria", which charted for 36 (consecutive) weeks from July 1982 to March 1983, for the longest-charting single of the 1980s by a solo artist.

The track "American Bandstand" was written about the music TV show of the same name and the presenter/host Dick Clark. The song was performed on the show.

"Hold Me Down" was originally recorded and released on Mardones' 1978 debut album Thank God for Girls.

Critical reception
In Billboard's review dated 10 May 1980 staff gave a warm response on this album. As per them the music "recalls Bob Seger at his best". They concluded, "there are no frills here, just basic mainstream rock, well thought-out, well-played and totally credible".

Track listing
 "She's So French" 4:35 (Benny Mardones, David Leigh Byron)
 "Mighta Been Love" 4:07 (Mardones, Robert Tepper)
 "Into the Night" 4:32 (Mardones, Tepper)
 "Crazy Boy" 4:21 (Mardones, Byron)
 "Hold Me Down" 3:15 (Mardones, Byron, Hayden Wayne)
 "American Bandstand" 3:51 (Mardones, Byron)
 "Hey Baby" 3:55 (Mardones)
 "Hometown Girls" 3:14 (Mardones, Byron)
 "Too Young" 5:14 (Mardones, Tepper)

Chart performance

Personnel
Credits are adapted from the Never Run, Never Hide vinyl LP sleeve notes.

 Benny Mardones – lead vocals, backing vocals
 Ron Bloom, Bobby Massaro – guitars
 Kinny Landrum – keyboards
 "Rockin'" Leigh Foxx – bass
 Sandy Gennaro – drums
 Robert Tepper – backing vocals

Production
 Barry Mraz – producer, engineer
 David "The Gazelle" Gotlieb, Paul Speck – assistant engineers
 Greg Calbi – mastering

Sleeve
 Richard Walker – photography
 Stephanie Zuras – design
 Bob Heimall – art direction

References

External links
 [ Track listing]
 [ Credits]
 Songwriters and publishing

1980 albums
Benny Mardones albums
Polydor Records albums